PRSL may refer to:

Puerto Rico Soccer League
Pennsylvania-Reading Seashore Lines